Willie M. Jackson (born July 15, 1951) is an American politician. He is a member of the Georgia House of Representatives, serving since 2009. Jackson has sponsored 158 bills. He is a member of the Democratic party.

Political positions

Abortion
Jackson was the only Democrat in the House to vote for Georgia House Bill 481, which prevents physicians from performing abortions after six weeks with limited exceptions.

References

Democratic Party members of the Georgia House of Representatives
21st-century American politicians
Living people
People from Sandersville, Georgia
1951 births